This is a list of Arab Americans. It includes prominent and notable Arab American individuals from various fields, such as business, science, entertainment, sports and fine arts.

Academia

Science
Elias J. Corey, Lebanese, organic chemistry professor at Harvard University, winner of the 1990 Nobel Prize in Chemistry
 Ahmed Zewail, Damanhour-born Egyptian, scientist, known as the "father of femtochemistry", winner of the 1999 Nobel Prize in Chemistry
Michael E. DeBakey, Lebanese, cardiovascular surgeon and researcher, 1963 Lasker Award laureate
Omar M. Yaghi, Amman-born Jordanian, reticular chemistry pioneer; winner of the 2018 Wolf Prize in Chemistry
Mostafa El-Sayed, Egyptian, US National Medal of Science laureate;  nanoscience researcher; known for the spectroscopy rule named after him, the El-Sayed rule
Riad Barmada , Aleppo - born Syrian , served as the president of the Illinois Orthopedic Society.
Eman Ghoneim, Minea-born Egyptian, space scientist in desert regions
 Farouk El-Baz, Zagazig-born Egyptian, space scientist who worked with NASA to assist in the planning of scientific exploration of the Moon
 Huda Zoghbi, Beirut-born Lebanese, physician and medical researcher who discovered the genetic cause of the Rett syndrome
 Huda Akil, Damascus-born Syrian, neuroscientist and medical researcher
 Yasmine Belkaid, Algiers-born Algerian, immunologist, professor and a senior investigator at the National Institute of Allergy and Infectious Diseases
 Mounir Laroussi, Sfax-born Tunisian, plasma physicist, pioneer of plasma medicine
 Hunein Maassab, Damascus-born Syrian, professor of epidemiology and the inventor of the live attenuated influenza vaccine
 Joanne Chory, Lebanese, plant biologist and geneticist 
 Anthony Atala, Peruvian-born Lebanese, Director of the Wake Forest Institute for Regenerative Medicine 
 Noureddine Melikechi, Thénia-born, Atomic, Molecular, and Optical Physicist, member of the Mars Science Laboratory
 Michel T. Halbouty, Lebanese, geologist and geophysicist; pioneer in oil field research
 Adah al-Mutairi Saudi, inventor and scholar in nanotechnology and nanomedicine
 M. Amin Arnaout, Sidon-born Lebanese, nephrologist and biologist
 Essam Heggy, Libyan-born Egyptian, Planetary scientist
 Shadia Habbal, Homs-born Syrian, astronomer and physicist specialized in Space physics
 Miriam Merad, French-born Algerian, immunologist

Engineering/computer science
 Charles Elachi, Rayak-born Lebanese, professor of electrical engineering and planetary science at Caltech and the former director of the Jet Propulsion Laboratory
 Fawwaz T. Ulaby Damascus-born Syrian, professor of Electrical Engineering and Computer Science, former Vice President of Research for the University of Michigan; first Arab-American winner of the IEEE Edison Medal
Taher ElGamal, Cairo-born Egyptian, cryptographer, inventor of the ElGamal discrete log cryptosystem and the ElGamal signature scheme
 Ali H. Nayfeh, Tulkarm-born Palestinian, mechanical engineer, the 2014 recipient of Benjamin Franklin Medal in mechanical engineering
 Dina Katabi, Damascus-born Syrian, Professor of Electrical Engineering and Computer Science at MIT and the director of the MIT Wireless Center.
Abbas El Gamal, Cairo-born Egyptian, electrical engineer, educator and entrepreneur, the recipient of the 2012 Claude E. Shannon Award
Ali Al-Sharah, American born Iraqi, computer scientist studying computer science in Washington State. 
John Makhoul, Deirmimas-born Lebanese, computer scientist who works in the field of speech and language processing.
Jerrier A. Haddad, Syrian-Lebanese, computer engineer who worked with IBM.
 Oussama Khatib, Aleppo-born Syrian, roboticist and a professor of computer science 
 Elias Zerhouni, Nedroma-born Algerian, former director of the National Institutes of Health
 Hassan Kamel Al-Sabbah, Nabatieh-born Lebanese, technology innovator. He received 43 patents.
 Mohammad S. Obaidat, Irbid-born Jordanian, computer science/engineering academic and scholar
Charbel Farhat, Lebanese-American, Vivian Church Hoff Professor of Aircraft Structures in the School of Engineering and inaugural James and Anna Marie Spilker Chair of the Department of Aeronautics and Astronautics, at Stanford University; Member of the National Academy of Engineering (US); Member of the Royal Academy of Engineering (UK); and Member of the Lebanese Academy of Sciences
Hany Farid, Egyptian, Professor of computer science at Dartmouth College, pioneer in Digital forensics 
Ahmed Tewfik, Cairo-born Egyptian, electrical engineer, Professor and college administrator
Munther A. Dahleh, Tulkarm-born Palestinian, Professor and Director at Massachusetts Institute of Technology

Humanities
Ismail al-Faruqi, Jaffa-born Palestinian, philosopher, professor
Fouad Ajami, Arnoun-born Lebanese, Professor of International Relations 
Saddeka Arebi, Tripoli-born Libyan, professor of anthropology at UC Berkeley
Mohammed Adam El-Sheikh, Sudanese, executive director of the Fiqh Council of North America 
Samih Farsoun, Haifa-born Palestinian, sociology professor at the American University
Philip Khuri Hitti, Shimlan-born Lebanese, historian of Arab culture and history 
Philip S. Khoury, Lebanese, Ford International Professor of History and Associate Provost at the Massachusetts Institute of Technology 
Laura Nader, cultural anthropologist
Edward Said, Jerusalem-born Palestinian, literary theorist and former professor at Columbia University
Nada Shabout, UK-born Palestinian-Iraqi, Professor of Art History at University of North Texas
 Naseer Aruri, Jerusalem-born Palestinian ,Chancellor Professor of Political Science at University of Massachusetts, Dartmouth
 Nadia Abu El Haj, Palestinian, Author & Professor of Anthropology at Barnard College and subject of a major tenure controversy case at Columbia University
 Ibrahim Abu-Lughod, Jaffa-born Palestinian, former Director of Graduate Studies at Northwestern University, father of Lila Abu-Lughod
 Lila Abu-Lughod, Palestinian, professor of Anthropology and Women's and Gender Studies at Columbia University
 Leila Farsakh, Jordan-born Palestinian, Professor of Political Science at the University of Massachusetts, Boston
 Samih Farsoun, Professor of sociology at American University and editor of Arab Studies Quarterly
 Nadia Hijab, Syria-born Palestinian, Journalist with Middle East Magazine and Senior Fellow at the Institute for Palestine Studies
 Rashid Khalidi, Palestinian, Professor of Modern Arab Studies at Columbia University
 Joseph Massad, Jordan-born Palestinian, Professor at Columbia University known for his work on nationalism and sexuality in the Arab world
 Hisham Sharabi, Jaffa-born Palestinian, Professor Emeritus of History 
Umar al-Mukhtar, Tobruk-born Libyan, Chair of Arab Culture at Georgetown University
 Rosemarie Said Zahlan, Egypt-born Palestinian, historian, journalist & author, sister of Edward Said
 Steven Salaita, Jordanian-Palestinian, former Professor of English at Virginia Tech, winner of Myers Outstanding Book Award for the Study of Human Rights 2007
 Majid Khadduri, Mosul-born Iraqi, academic and founder of the Paul H. Nitze School of Advanced International Studies Middle East Studies program
 Noura Erakat, Palestinian, human rights attorney and Assistant Professor at Rutgers University
 Thomas L. Saaty, Assyrian-Iraqi, University Professor at the University of Pittsburgh
 Nada Shabout, UK-born Palestinian-Iraqi, art historian and Assistant Professor at the University of North Texas
 Ella Shohat, professor, author and activist
 Saadi Simawe, Diwaniyah-born Iraqi, translator, novelist and teacher
 Donny George Youkhanna, Habbaniyah-born Iraqi, archaeologist, anthropologist, author, curator, and scholar, and a visiting professor at Stony Brook University in New York
Imad-ad-Dean Ahmad, teaches religion, science, and freedom at the University of Maryland, College Park; directs the Minaret of Freedom Institute
Muhsin Mahdi, Karbala-born Iraqi, Islamologist and Arabist.
Talal Asad, Medina-born Saudi, anthropologist at the CUNY Graduate Center.

University presidents
Mitch Daniels, Syrian, President of Purdue University 
Donna Shalala, Lebanese, President of the University of Miami
Joseph E. Aoun, Beirut-born Lebanese, president of Northeastern University
Robert Khayat, Lebanese, chancellor of the University of Mississippi 
Nido Qubein, Lebanese, president of High Point University 
David Adamany, Lebanese, former president of the Temple University

Business
Steve Jobs, half Syrian, head and co-founder of Apple
Tony Fadell, Polish-Lebanese, product development manager at Apple Inc., co-inventor of iPod and iPhone
Mohamed A. El-Erian, Egyptian, CEO and co-CIO of PIMCO 
Alec Gores, Israel-born Lebanese-Palestinian, founder of Gores Group; on the Forbes list of billionaires
Tom Gores, Israel-born Greek-Lebanese, founder and CEO of Platinum Equity; on the Forbes list of billionaires (Palestinian-born of Lebanese descent)
Sam Gores, Israel-born Lebanese-Palestinian, founder of talent agency Paradigm Agency; on the Forbes list of billionaires 
Najeeb Halaby, Lebanese-Syrian, former head of Federal Aviation Administration and CEO of Pan-American Airlines, and father of Queen Noor of Jordan
Ray R. Irani, Lebanon-born Palestinian, Chairman and CEO of Occidental Petroleum
Joseph Jacobs, Australia-born Lebanese, founder of Jacobs Engineering, one of the engineering firms in the US
Charif Souki, Cairo-born Egyptian, co-founder and former CEO of Cheniere Energy. 
Amin Khoury, businessman and founder of B/E Aerospace
Omar Hamoui, Syrian, founder and CEO of Google AdMob (Syrian)
Lucie Salhany, Jordanian-Lebanese, former Chairwoman of Fox Broadcasting Company. 
Marcus Lemonis, Beirut-born Lebanese-Syrian, chairman and CEO of Camping World, Good Sam Enterprises and Gander Outdoors. 
George Joseph, Lebanese, founder of Mercury Insurance Group. 
Joe Jamail, businessman who was the wealthiest practicing attorney in America. 
Allen Adham, Lebanese, co-founder of Blizzard Entertainment. 
Mario Kassar, Beirut-born Lebanese-Italian, formerly headed Carolco Pictures
John J. Mack, Lebanese, CEO of investment bank Morgan Stanley
Maloof family, Lebanese family who owns numerous business properties in the Western United States, majority owners of the Sacramento Kings and the Palms Casino Hotel in Paradise, Nevada
Sam Moore, Beirut-born Lebanese, founder and president of Thomas Nelson Publishers, the largest worldwide distributor of the Bible
Manuel Moroun, Lebanese, owner of CenTra, Inc., the holding company which controls the Ambassador Bridge and Michigan Central Depot
Jacques Nasser, Amyoun-born Lebanese, former president and CEO of Ford Motor Company (Lebanese)
Efrem Harkham, Israel-born Iraqi-American, founder and CEO of LuxeHotels, owner of Luxe Rodeo Drive Hotel
Farouk Shami, Ramallah-born Palestinian, founder of Farouk systems, a Houston-based company that manufactures hair care and spa products like CHI hair Irons
John Zogby, Lebanese, founder and current President/CEO of Zogby International
Sam Yagan, Syrian, Entrepreneur and business executive, co-founder of SparkNotes, eDonkey, OkCupid, and Techstars Chicago, also CEO of Match Group, including Tinder 
Rana el Kaliouby, Egyptian, computer scientist, CEO of Affectiva, Researcher at MIT Media Lab, contributor to facial expression recognition research and technology development
Haim Saban, Egypt-born Israeli-American, television and media proprietor
Huda Kattan, Iraqi, CEO of Huda Beauty
Magid Abraham, Mashghara-born Lebanese, market research expert and businessman
Nahim Abraham, Kafarakab-born Lebanese, businessman, philanthropist
Paul Orfalea, Lebanese, founder of Kinko's
 Richard E. Rainwater, Lebanese, investor and fund manager
 Robert Khuzami, Lebanese, former director of the U.S. Securities and Exchange Commission 
 Thomas J. Barrack, Jr., Lebanese, businessman and founder of Colony Capital

Arts and entertainment
Sam Esmail, Egyptian, screenwriter, director and producer; creator of the television series Mr. Robot 
Kevin Hanna, Syrian, writer, director and producer; creator of the film The Clockwork Girl 
Callie Khouri, Lebanese, Academy Award-winning screenwriter
William Peter Blatty,Lebanese, Academy Award-winning screenwriter and writer
Nessa Diab, Egyptian, Radio and TV personality and television host 
Sanaa Hamri, Tangier-born Moroccan, music video and movie director; her films include the Sisterhood of the Traveling Pants 2 
Moustapha Akkad, Syrian-American film producer and director
Casey Kasem, Lebanese Druze, radio personality and voice actor, co-founder of American Top 40 franchise, 
George Noory, Lebanese, radio broadcaster of late-night paranormal-themed radio talk show Coast to Coast AM
Mario Kassar, Beirut-born Lebanese, film producer, founder of Carolco Pictures
Jordan Nassar, half-Palestinian, visual artist working with Palestinian embroidery
Tom Shadyac, Lebanese, director, screenwriter and producer
Tony Thomas, Lebanese, producer
Jehane Noujaim, Lebanese-Egyptian, documentary film director
Kerri Kasem, Lebanese, radio personality
Dan Jbara, Lebanese, television and film producer
Diane Rehm,Syrian-Lebanese, host and executive producer of The Diane Rehm Show on National Public Radio
Elie Samaha, Zahlé-born Lebanese, film producer
Sonya Tayeh, award-winning dancer and choreographer. 
Emile Kuri, Mexico-born Lebanese, Academy Award-winning art director
Zaida Ben-Yusuf, UK-born Algerian,portrait photographer
Sam Maloof, Lebanese furniture designer and woodworker
Rima Fakih, Srifa-born Lebanese, Miss USA 2010
Remi Kanazi, Palestinian, performance poet
Yousef Abu-Taleb, Jordanian, actor, lonelygirl15; film producer
Adam Saleh, Yemeni, YouTuber and singer
Cherien Dabis, Palestinian, film director
Yousef Erakat, Palestinian, YouTuber and actor
Gabbie Hanna, Lebanese, comedian, actress, YouTube personality, singer

Actors
Tony Shalhoub, Lebanese, three-time Emmy Award-winning television actor on Monk
Danny Thomas, Lebanese, Emmy Award-winning actor, founder of St. Jude Children's Research Hospital; father of Marlo Thomas 
Marlo Thomas, Lebanese, Golden Globe and Emmy Award-winning actress
Rami Malek, Egyptian, Emmy Award and Academy Award - winning actor
Demián Bichir, Mexico-born Lebanese, Academy Award-nominated actor
Vic Tayback, Syrian, two-time Golden Globe-winning actor
Kristy McNichol, Lebanese, two-time Emmy Award-winning actress 
F. Murray Abraham, Syrian-American, Academy Award-winning actor (Amadeus)
Tige Andrews, Syrian, Emmy-nominated actor
Michael Ansara, Lebanon-born, actor
Sofia Boutella, Algerian, actress, model, and Hip-hop dancer
George Nader, Lebanese, American film and television actor.
Jenna Dewan, Lebanese, film/TV actress (Step Up)
Shannon Elizabeth, Syrian-Lebanese, film actress (American Pie, Scary Movie)
Khrystyne Haje, Lebanese, actress on Head of the Class
Teri Hatcher, Syrian, actress
Salma Hayek, Mexico-born Lebanese, Mexican actress
Rowan Blanchard, Syrian, actress
Anissa Jones,Lebanese, actress, Family Affair 
Jamie Farr, Lebanese, character actor
Catherine Keener, Lebanese, actress
Wendie Malick, Egyptian, actress
Alanna Masterson, half Lebanese, actress,
Wentworth Miller, UK-born Lebanese-Syrian, actor on Prison Break
Najee Mondalek, Lebanon-born, actor/playwright
Kathy Najimy, Lebanese, actress
Gregory Jbara, Lebanese, television and film actor
Alia Shawkat, half-Iraqi, actress on Arrested Development
James Stacy, part-Lebanese, actor
Paola Turbay, part-Lebanese, actress
Vince Vaughn, part-Lebanese, actor
Amy Yasbeck, part-Lebanese, actress
Sammy Sheik, Alexandria-born Egyptian, actor
Omar Metwally, half-Egyptian, actor
Waleed Zuaiter, Palestinian, actor
Mo Gallini, half-Lebanese, actor
Michael Nouri, half-Iraqi, actor
Haaz Sleiman, Beirut-born Lebanese, television and film actor
Emeraude Toubia, Canada-born part-Lebanese, actress
Edy Ganem, half-Lebanese, actress
Nadia Dajani, half-Palestinian, actress
Rose Abdoo, half-Lebanese, comedian, actress
John Kassir, American actor, voice actor and comedian.
Ramy Youssef, Egyptian, writer and star of Ramy
Zeeko Zaki, Egyptian, actor

Comedians
Brian Awadis, Iraqi, Youtuber and actor
Jerry Seinfeld, half-Syrian Jewish, stand-up comedian, actor and writer
Dean Obeidallah, half-Palestinian, stand-up comedian, writer
Ahmed Ahmed, Helwan-born Egyptian, actor and comedian 
Mohammed Amer, Kuwait-born Palestinian, comedian, writer, actor; Rolling Stone, Al Barnameg, Allah Made Me Funny 
Remy Munasifi, Iraqi-Lebanese, comedian also known as GoRemy
Anwar Jibawi, Palestinian, YouTuber and comedian (Palestinian)
Ronnie Khalil, Egyptian, stand-up comedian
Aron Kader, half-Palestinian, stand-up comedian
Maysoon Zayid, Palestinian, actress and comedian
Ray Hanania, Palestinian,  journalist and stand-up comedian
Kassem G, Amman-born Jordanian-Egyptian, comedian, actor, and YouTuber

Reality show
Farrah Abraham, part-Syrian, reality television personality, participated in 16 and Pregnant and Teen Mom
Tareq Salahi, half-Palestinian, television personality, appeared on The Real Housewives of D.C.
Adrienne Maloof, half-Lebanese, businesswoman, television personality, cast member of The Real Housewives of Beverly Hills
Aja (entertainer), Egyptian-Moroccan, known for competing on RuPaul's Drag Race
Laith Al-Saadi, half-Iraqi, finalist on the 10th season of The Voice
Tarek El Moussa, part-Moroccan, businessman, television personality, cast member of Flip or Flop

Fashion designers
Joseph Abboud, Lebanese, menswear fashion designer and author
Reem Acra, Beirut-born Lebanese, fashion designer
Norma Kamali, Lebanese, fashion designer
Rami Kashou, Palestinian, fashion designer

Models
Gigi Hadid, half-Palestinian, supermodel and TV personality
Bella Hadid, half-Palestinian, supermodel and TV personality
Touriya Haoud, half-Moroccan, fashion model and actress
Wafah Dufour, half-Saudi, fashion model and singer
Jaclyn Stapp, Jordanian, beauty queen and fashion model
Amy Fadhli, half-Iraqi, fitness model, actress and winner of the Fitness America National Champion 1996

Musicians
Paula Abdul, half-Syrian Jewish (considers herself Jewish and not ethnically Arab), singer, musician, writer, actress, and television personality 
Paul Anka, Lebanese, singer/songwriter
Frank Zappa, part-Lebanese, musician
DJ Khaled, Palestinian, hip-hop DJ, rapper, music producer
RedOne, Tetouan-born Moroccan, producer, songwriter, music executive
Tiffany, born Tiffany Renee Darwish, half-Lebanese, singer
Tiny Tim (born Herbert Khaury), half-Lebanese, musician 
French Montana, Casablanca-born Moroccan, rapper
Paul Jabara, Lebanese, actor, singer, songwriter
Dick Dale, half-Lebanese, surf rock guitarist
Andrew Bazzi, half-Lebanese, singer-songwriter
Soraya, part-Lebanese, singer/songwriter
G.E. Smith, half-Lebanese, lead guitarist in the band Hall & Oates; musical director of Saturday Night Live
David Yazbek, half-Lebanese, songwriter and musician
Raef Haggag Egyptian, singer
Stephan Said, half-Iraqi, singer, musician, writer and activist
Kareem Salama, Maghrebi, country singer-songwriter and musician
Alissa Musto, singer/pianist
Kurtis Mantronik, Jamaica-born half-Syrian, born Kurtis el Khaleel, remixer and producer, founding member of 1980s old school hip hop group Mantronix
Malek Jandali, Germany-born Syrian, composer and pianist (Syrian-American)
Ferras, half-Jordanian, singer-songwriter
Fredwreck, Palestinian, hip hop producer
Mohammed Fairouz, musician, composer
Emilio Estefan, Cuba-born half-Lebanese, manager and producer of wife Gloria Estefan
Ayad Al Adhamy, Bahraini-born, synthesizer player and multi-instrumentalist musician
Jeff Becerra, death metal musician
Ron Affif, half-Lebanese, jazz guitarist and musician
Jack Barakat, Lebanese, All Time Low guitarist/songwriter
Queen Naija, half-Yemeni, singer and songwriter
Dave Hall, Quarter-Lebanese, singer/songwriter and composer

Literature
Khalil Gibran, Bsharri-born Lebanese, writer, poet, and member of the New York Pen League; the third-best-selling poet of all time. 
William Peter Blatty, Lebanese, writer best known for his 1971 horror novel The Exorcist 
Laila Lalami, Rabat-born Moroccan, Pulitzer Prize-nominated novelist, journalist, essayist, and professor
Mikhail Naimy, Baskinta-born Lebanese, member of the New York Pen League; well-known works include The Book of Mirdad and a biography of Khalil Gibran
Ameen Rihani, Syria-born Lebanese, "father of Arab American literature," member of the New York Pen League and author of The Book of Khalid, the first Arab American novel in English;
Edward Said, Jerusalem-born Palestinian, literary theorist, thinker, and the founder of the academic field of postcolonial studies. 
Stephen Adly Guirgis, half-Egyptian, Pulitzer Prize-winning playwright
Hisham Matar, Libyan, Pulitzer Prize-winning writer
Steven Naifeh, Iran-born half-Lebanese, Pulitzer Prize-winning author
Raymond Khoury, Beirut-born Lebanese, screenwriter and novelist, best known as the author of the 2006 New York Times bestseller The Last Templar
Saladin Ahmed, Lebanese-Egyptian, Eisner Award-winning comic book and fantasy writer
Ted Naifeh, comic book writer and artist.
Stephen Karam, Lebanese, Tony Award-winning playwright and screenwriter
Mona Simpson, half-Syrian, novelist; author of Anywhere but Here
Elmaz Abinader, Lebanese, poet, playwright, memoirist, writer
Diana Abu-Jaber, half-Jordanian, novelist and professor, author of Arabian Jazz and Crescent 
Nasib Arida, Homs-born Syrian, poet and writer of the Mahjar movement.
Abd al-Masih Haddad, Homs-born Syrian, writer of the Mahjar movement and journalist
Elia Abu Madi, Bikfaya-born Lebanese, poet, publisher and member of the New York Pen League
Etel Adnan, Lebanon-born half-Syrian, poet, essayist, and visual artist
Suheir Hammad, Jordan-born Palestinian, poet, playwright, artist, Tony Award winner
Samuel John Hazo, half-Lebanese, State Poet of Pennsylvania
Lawrence Joseph, Syrian-Lebanese, poet
Lisa Suhair Majaj, Palestinian, poet and literary scholar
Khaled Mattawa, Benghazi-born Libyan, poet, recipient of an Academy of American Poets award
Claire Messud, half-Algerian, author
Naomi Shihab Nye, half-Palestinian, poet
Abraham Rihbany, Shweir-born Lebanese, writer on politics and religion
Steven Salaita, Jordanian-Palestinian, expert on comparative literature and post-colonialism, writer, activist
Ibtisam Barakat, Jerusalem-born Palestinian, award-winning writer and poet
Reem Kassis, Jerusalem-born Palestinianwriter on food, culture and politics (Palestinian)

Media and journalism
Helen Thomas, Lebanese, reporter, columnist, and White House correspondent 
Hala Gorani, Syrian, journalist and anchor of CNN's International Desk; Levantine Cultural Center
Anthony Shadid, Lebanese, Pulitzer Prize-winning journalist, foreign correspondent
Hoda Kotb, Egyptian, broadcast journalist and TV host on Dateline NBC and the Today Show 
Jim Avila, half-Lebanese, correspondent for ABC News "20/20",
Jamal Dajani, Jerusalem-born Palestinian television producer and Middle East analyst
Paula Faris, half Lebanese television correspondent and personality
Ray Hanania, Palestinian, award-winning journalist; Managing Editor of The Arab Daily News; President and CEO of Urban Strategies Group media and political consultants
Diane Rehm, American public radio talk show host
Dena Takruri, Palestinian, journalist, on-air presenter, and producer
Fawaz Gerges, Beirut-born Lebanese, ABC analyst and regular guest on "Oprah's Anti-war series" 
Yasmeen Sami Alamiri, Iraqi, journalist, first member of the White House foreign press pool
Susan Chira, Syrian, journalist, former New York Times editor, foreign correspondent
Lorraine Ali, Iraqi, reporter, editor, culture writer and music critic for Newsweek 
Susie Gharib, co-anchor of the Nightly Business Report
Walid Phares, Batroun-born Lebanese, Fox News correspondent, Middle Eastern policy advisor to the 2012 Mitt Romney presidential campaign and the 2016 Donald Trump presidential campaign
Paul Ajlouny, Ramallah-born Palestinian, founder of the Palestinian newspaper Al-Fajr
Daoud Kuttab, Bethlehem-born Palestinian, award-winning journalist; Ferris Professor of Journalism at Princeton University 
Nasser Weddady Mauritanian, activist, Director of Civil Rights Outreach at American Islamic Congress
Mona Eltahawy, Port Said-born Egyptian, freelance journalist
Ayman Mohyeldin, Cairo-born Palestinian-Egyptian, journalist for NBC News 
Serena Shim, Lebanese, journalist for Press TV

Military
John Abizaid, Lebanese
Ahmed Qusai al-Taayie, Iraqi-born, specialist in the United States Army who was kidnapped by insurgents in Baghdad, Iraq, on October 23, 2006
Florent Groberg, France-born part-Algerian
James Jabara, Lebanese
George Joulwan, Lebanese
Peter Mansoor
Michael A. Monsoor, part-Lebanese, first Arab American Medal of Honor awardee
Ray Hanania, Palestinian, Vietnam Era Military Service, U.S. Air Force

Politics
James Abdnor, Lebanese, U.S. Senator (R-South Dakota) (1981–1987)
John Abizaid, Lebanese, retired general
James Abourezk, Lebanese, U.S. Senator (D-South Dakota) (1973–1979)
Spencer Abraham, Lebanese, U.S. Secretary of Energy (2001–2005) and U.S. Senator (R-Michigan) Secretary of Energy under Bush (1995–2001) 
Justin Amash, Syrian-Palestinian, U.S. Representative (R-Michigan) (2011–2021)
Victor G. Atiyeh, Syrian-Lebanese, former Governor of Oregon (R) (1979–1987) 
John Baldacci, half-Lebanese, Governor of Maine (D) (2003–2011)
Rosemary Barkett, Mexico-born Syrian, U.S. Circuit Judge and the first woman Supreme Court Justice and Chief Justice for the state of Florida
Charles Boustany, Lebanese, U.S. Representative from Louisiana; cousin of Victoria Reggie Kennedy
Charlie Crist, part-Lebanese, former Governor of Florida (R) (2007–2011), U.S. Congressman (D-Florida) (2017–present)
Pat Danner, Lebanese, U.S. Congresswoman (D-Mo.) (1993–2001)
Brigitte Gabriel, Marjayoun-born Lebanese, pro-Israel activist and founder of the American Congress For Truth
Philip Charles Habib, Lebanese, Under Secretary of State for Political Affairs and Special Envoy to Ronald Reagan
Lisa Halaby, Syrian-Lebanese,(a.k.a. Queen Noor), Queen-consort of Jordan and wife of King Hussein of Jordan
Darrell Issa, half-Lebanese, U.S. Congressman (R-California) (2001–) 
Joe Jamail, Lebanese, Renown American trial lawyer and billionaire, also known as the "King of Torts"
James Jabara, Lebanese, colonel and Korean War flying ace 
Chris John, part-Lebanese, U.S. Congressman (D-Louisiana) (1997–2005) 
George Joulwan, part-Syrian, retired general, former NATO commander-in-chief 
George Kasem, Lebanese, U.S. Congressman (D-California) (1959-1961)
Abraham Kazen, Lebanese, U.S. Congressman (D-Texas) (1967–1985)
Jill Kelley, Beirut-born Lebanese, global advocate and American socialite 
Victoria Reggie Kennedy, Lebanese, attorney and widow of late Senator Ted Kennedy 
Johnny Khamis, Palestinian, Council member from San Jose 
Ray LaHood, half-Lebanese, U.S. Congressman (R-Illinois) (1995–2009), U.S. Secretary of Transportation (2009–2013)
Darin LaHood, part-Lebanese, U.S. Congressman (R-Illinois) (2015–), son of Ray Lahood
George J. Mitchell, half-Lebanese, U.S. Senator (D-Maine) (1980–1995) US special envoy to the Middle East under the Obama administration, U.S. senator from Maine, Senate Majority Leader 
Ralph Nader, Lebanese, politician and consumer advocate, author, lecturer, and attorney, candidate for US Presidency
Jimmy Naifeh, Lebanese, Speaker of the Tennessee House of Representatives (D) 
Mary Rose Oakar, Lebanese-Syrian, U.S. Congresswoman (D-Ohio) (1977–1993)
Jeanine Pirro, Lebanese, former Westchester County District Attorney and New York Republican attorney general candidate 
Dina Powell, Cairo-born Egyptian, current U.S. Deputy National Security Advisor for Strategy 
Edward Rafeedie, Palestinian, U.S. District Judge for the Central District of California 
Nick Rahall, Lebanese, U.S. Congressman (D-West Virginia) (1977–2015) 
Selwa Roosevelt, Lebanese, former Chief of Protocol of the United States and wife of the late Archibald Bulloch Roosevelt, Jr., grandson of President Theodore Roosevelt
 Zainab Salbi, Baghdad-born Iraqi, co-founder and president of Women for Women International 
Donna Shalala, Lebanese, U.S. Secretary of Health and Human Services (1993–2001)
Chris Sununu, Lebanese-Palestinian, Governor of New Hampshire (R) (2017–), son of Governor John H. Sununu
John E. Sununu, Lebanese-Palestinian, U.S. Senator (R-New Hampshire) (2003–2009)
John H. Sununu, Cuba-born Lebanese-Palestinian, Governor of New Hampshire (R) (1983–1989) and Chief of Staff to George H. W. Bush 
Rashida Tlaib, Palestinian, U.S. Congresswoman (D-Michigan)(2016-) 
James Zogby, half-Lebanese, founder and president of the Arab American Institute
Hady Amr, Beirut-born Lebanese, diplomat, founding director of Brookings Doha Center (Lebanese father)

Sports
Toni Breidinger, half-Lebanese, NASCAR driver, First Female Arab in the sport 
Alaa Abdelnaby, Alexandria-born Egyptian, played for Duke and five years in the NBA 
Rony Seikaly, Beirut-born Lebanese, former NBA player, now DJ
Abdel Nader, Alexandria-born Egyptian, player for the Oklahoma City Thunder of the National Basketball Association 
Salah Mejri, Oued Melliz-born Tunisian professional basketball for the Dallas Mavericks of the National Basketball Association.
Justin Abdelkader, part-Jordanian, ice hockey forward playing in NHL
Brandon Saad, half-Syrian, NHL player 
Patrick Maroon, Lebanese, ice hockey player for the Edmonton Oilers in the NHL
 Johnny Manziel, part-Lebanese, NFL player
Oday Aboushi, Palestinian, NFL player 
Doug Flutie, half-Lebanese, NFL player 
Drew Haddad, Jordanian, NFL player 
Gibran Hamdan, half-Palestinian, NFL QB 
Bill George, NFL player and Hall of Fame.
Jeff George, Lebanese, NFL quarterback
Rich Kotite, retired NFL tight end; NFL Head coach for the Philadelphia Eagles and New York Jets
 Abe Mickal – Talia-born Lebanese, football player for LSU
 Matt Kalil – half-Lebanese, NFL player 
 Ryan Kalil – NFL player (Lebanese father)
 Frank Kalil – former American football offensive lineman. 
Adam Shaheen, tight end from Ashland
Joe Robbie, former owner and founder of the NFL's Miami Dolphins
Rocco Baldelli professional baseball player (Syrian) 
John Jaha, MLB baseball player (Lebanese)
Sam Khalifa, MLB baseball player (Egyptian)
Joe Lahoud, MLB player for Boston and California (Lebanese descent)
Mikie Mahtook, Major League Baseball outfielder (Lebanese descent)
Damien Sandow, WWE wrestler (Lebanese)
Sabu ECW wrestler (Lebanese mother)
Skandor Akbar former professional wrestler (Lebanese)
Ed Farhat Lebanese-American professional wrestler best known by his ring name The Sheik
Adnan Al-Kaissie former professional wrestler and manager (Iraqi) 
Armando Estrada professional wrestler and manager ( Palestinian) 
Mojo Rawley professional wrestler currently signed to WWE ( Palestinian and Syrian) 
Dina Al-Sabah, professional figure competitor (Kuwaiti descent)
Sarah Attar track and field athlete (Saudi Arabian father) 
Isra Girgrah, boxer
Naseem Hamed, commonly known as Prince Naseem or Naz, former boxer, former featherweight world champion. (Yemeni parents)
Jim Harrick, UCLA coach
Omar Hassan, pro skateboarder
Ahmed Kaddour professional boxer, from NBC show The Contender (Lebanese)
Hocine Khalfi, professional boxer, Algerian-American
Khalid Khannouchi, athlete marathon runner (Moroccan)
 Amir Khillah, mixed martial artist and The Ultimate Fighter contestant (Egyptian)
Gavin Maloof, businessman and owner of the Sacramento Kings
George Maloof, Sr. businessman and former owner of the NBA's Houston Rockets
Justin Meram, MLS player for Columbus Crew (Chaldo-Assaryian)
Faryd Mondragón, MLS player for Philadelphia Union (Lebanese parents)
Ramsey Nijem (Palestinian), mixed martial artist and UFC fighter
Bobby Rahal (Lebanese ancestry)
Soony Saad, MLS player (Lebanese descent)
Robert Saleh, defensive coordinator for the San Francisco 49ers (Lebanese Mother). 
Tarick Salmaci, professional boxer (Lebanese)
 Omar Sheika (Palestinian), professional boxer, four-time world title challenger
Kelly Slater, professional surfer (Lebanese descent)
Muhammad Halim, (Palestinian father)
 Sami Guediri, Footballer (Algerian Parents)

Others
 Naser Jason Abdo, former soldier convicted of planning an attack near Fort Hood
 Sami Al-Arian, professor guilty of conspiracy to contribute services to or for the benefit of a Specially Designated Terrorist organization (Palestinian)
Anwar al-Awlaki, believed by US officials to be a recruiter involved in planning terrorist operations for the Islamist militant group al-Qaeda (Yemeni)
Nihad Awad, founding Executive Director of largest Muslim civil rights organization in the U.S., Council on American Islamic Relations (CAIR) (Palestinian)
Rosemary Barkett, federal judge and first woman Justice and Chief Justice on the Florida Supreme Court (Syrian)
Charles Bishop, suicide by plane crash in Tampa, Florida; grandson of Syrian immigrant
Nidal Hasan, former soldier convicted of the 2009 Fort Hood shooting (Palestinian descent)
Hussein Ibish, writer, journalist, advocate for Arab causes in the United States (Lebanese)
Candice Lightner, founder of MADD (Lebanese mother)
Edward L. Masry, lawyer (Lebanese descent)
 Rasmea Odeh, convicted of immigration fraud, for concealing her arrest, conviction, and imprisonment for fatal terrorist bombing (Palestinian)
Walid Rabah, publisher
Saint Raphael of Brooklyn, first Orthodox bishop to be consecrated in North America; born Raphael Hawaweeny in Beirut of Damascene Syrian parents
Karim Rashid (Lebanese descent)
Zainab Salbi, co-founder and president of Women for Women International (Iraqi)
 Sirhan Sirhan, convicted murderer of Robert F. Kennedy (Palestinian with Jordanian citizenship)
Nadya Suleman, "Octomom", father is Iraqi
James Zogby, Arab-American civil rights activist (Arab-American Institute); brother of John (Lebanese descent)
John Zogby, pollster for Zogby International (Lebanese descent)

See also
List of Iraqi Americans
List of Lebanese Americans
List of Palestinian Americans
Syrian Americans
Yemeni-American
List of Egyptian Americans

References

External links
 I Want My Son to be Proud by Casey Kasem
 Famous Arab Americans
 Children of Al-Mahjar: Arab American Literature Spans a Century – by Elmaz Abinader

Arab-American
Americans
 
Arab